HFCL (also Himachal Futuristic Communications Limited) is an Indian telecom company incorporated in 1987. It has been in operation into various segments of manufacturing, Research & Development and turnkey solutions.

The company is listed on both the Bombay Stock Exchange (BSE) and on the National Stock Exchange (NSE).

The company serves various industries, such as telecommunications, security and railways, textiles, Cable fiber.

History
In 1987, Himachal Futuristic Communications Limited was co-founded by Mahendra Nahata, Dr.Deepak Malhotra and Vinay Maloo and was one of the first private sector telecom companies in India. In May 1987, the company was incorporated as public limited company in the state of Himachal Pradesh.

The company set up manufacturing facilities in India for optical fiber cables, optical transport, power electronics and broadband equipment for global supply, and provided turnkey solutions to the Government of India's undertakings and private sector players across the world.

Ever since its inception, the company has entered various streams of hardware integration in telecommunications.

In 1995, company's $25 billion (₹850 billion) bid for basic services license in India created the momentum for telecom industry in the country.

In 2000, Australian businessman Kerry Packer known for his contribution to the sport of cricket, invested in the company and took 10% stake.

CPH and HFCL set up two joint venture firms, one for software products and services and other for B2B e-commerce.

HFCL together with its subsidiary HTL Limited, is one of the largest manufacturers of FTTH cables in India with a capacity of 6 lakh kms per annum.

With the new FTTH plant, HFCL has become the largest optical fibre manufacturer in the country.

In 2018, HFCL launched its optical fiber manufacturing unit in Hyderabad. The company is one of the largest telecom project service providers for Reliance Jio and is currently engaged in the rolling out of 4G optical fiber cables (OFC) network services across Northern India.

Geographical Presence
HFCL provides services across India with its headquarters in Gurgaon and Delhi. It has countrywide offices that includes production plants in Solan (Himachal Pradesh), Chennai (Tamil Nadu) and Goa. The company's regional offices are located in Indian states of Punjab, Rajasthan, Uttar Pradesh, West Bengal, Orissa, Madhya Pradesh, Maharashtra, Andhra Pradesh, Bihar, Kerala, Jharkhand and Uttarakhand.

Subsidiaries
HFCL Advance Systems
Moneta Finance Ltd
HTL Limited
DragonWave HFCL Ltd.
Microwave Communications
Polixel Security Systems

See also
Telecommunications in India
Fiber-optic communication

References

Telecommunications companies of India
Indian companies established in 1987
Conglomerate companies established in 1987
Companies based in New Delhi
1987 establishments in India